Taumarunui is a small town in the King Country of the central North Island of New Zealand. It is on an alluvial plain set within rugged terrain on the upper reaches of the Whanganui River, 65 km south of Te Kuiti and 55 km west of Turangi. It is under the jurisdiction of Ruapehu District and Manawatū-Whanganui region.

It is on State Highway 4 and the North Island Main Trunk railway.

The name Taumarunui is reported to be the dying words of the Māori chief Pehi Turoa – taumaru meaning screen and nui big, literally translated as Big Screen, being built to shelter him from the sun, or more commonly known to mean – "The place of big shelter".  There are also references to Taumarunui being known as large sheltered location for growing kumara.

In the 1980s publication Roll Back the Years there are some details on how Taumarunui got its name. Extract: "According to Frank T Brown, who wrote in the Taumarunui Press in 1926, the name Taumarunui is closely connected with the arrival of and conquering of that portion of the King Country by the Whanganui River natives during the 18th century . . . The war party that succeeded in capturing the principal pa and taking prisoner the chief of the district was headed by "Ki Maru". His warriors, to show their appreciation of his prowess and the honour of the victory, acclaimed him "Tau-maru-nui", which means "Maru the Great", or "Maru the Conqueror", that name was taken for the district and has been used ever since."

History and culture
Taumarunui was originally a Maori settlement at the confluence of the Ongarue River with the Whanganui, important canoe routes linking the interior of the island with the lower Whanganui River settlements. Some places, notably the valley of the Pungapunga Stream, which joins the upper Whanganui near Manunui, were celebrated for the size and quality of totara, and large canoes were built there. The area is a border area between a number of iwi including Whanganui, Ngāti Maniapoto and Ngāti Tūwharetoa, who lived together in relative harmony.

Late in December 1843 Bishop Selwyn travelled from the district south of Taupō to a point on the Whanganui River about six miles downstream from Taumarunui and thence continued his journey to the coast by canoe. Towards the end of 1869 Te Kooti was at Taumarunui before his march through the western Taupō district to Tapapa. In the early 1880s the first surveys of the King Country commenced and by the early 1890s the Crown had begun the purchase of large areas of land.

In 1874 Alexander Bell set up a trading post, and became the first European settler. The town has a road called Bell Road.

During the New Zealand Wars a resident named William Moffatt manufactured and supplied Maori with a coarse kind of gunpowder. He was afterwards expelled from the district. Despite warnings he returned in 1880, ostensibly to prospect for gold, and was executed.

The Whanganui River long continued to be the principal route serving Taumarunui. Traffic was at first by Maori canoe, but by the late 1880s regular steamship communication was established. Taumarunui Landing (Image) was the last stop on Alexander Hatrick's steam boat service from Wanganui. The river vessels maintained the services between Wanganui and Taumarunui until the late 1920s, when the condition of the river deteriorated.

Later Taumarunui gained importance with the completion of the North Island Main Trunk line in 1908–09 (celebrated in the 1957 ballad "Taumarunui on the Main Trunk Line" by Peter Cape, about the station refreshment room). The line south of Taumarunui caused considerable problems due to the terrain, and has several high viaducts and the famous Raurimu Spiral. The Stratford–Okahukura Line to Stratford connected just north of Taumarunui. In more recent times, the town's economy has been based on forestry and farming. It has gained in importance as a tourism centre, especially as an entry point for voyagers down the scenic Wanganui River and as the possessor of a high quality golf course.

Timeline

1800s
  1862, 8/9 February – James Coutts Crawford visits, was given a number of old songs and "various accounts of the taniwha, one of whom we were told overthrew the Wangaehu bridge."
 1864 – Boundaries of the King Country drawn and European settlement is prohibited.
 1869 – Te Kooti in Taumarunui.
 1871 – Thomas McDonnell in area following up on reports of gold. Claimed to have found goldbearing quartz in the creeks of 'Taurewa' .
 1874 – Alexander Bell set up a trading post, and became the first European settler.
 1880 – Moffatt and Henaro travel to the village of Matahaura, where William Moffatt is subsequently executed at Matapuna.
 1883 – John Rochford's survey party start surveying the rail route through the King Country.
 1884 – Prohibition to European settlement lifted.  Alcohol prohibition established.
 1885 – Photographer Alfred Burton, artist Edward Payton and surveyor John Rochford tour Te Rohe Pōtae along with time in Taumarunui.
  1885, 10 Dec – First post office opened in Taumarunui (under the name 'Taumaranui') as part of the Hamilton Postal District, closes 1887.

1900s

 1900 – town-to-be reportedly held only 13 European males. Another report said 40 or 50 members of Ngāti Hau and Mr Bell.
 1901 – Railways line joining Te Kuiti to Taumarunui opened. 
 1903 – Railway line passes through Taumarunui, and Taumarunui Railway Station opened on 1 December 1903 and Matapuna on 22 June 1903.
 1904 – First European child is born in township. 
 1904 – £10,000 houseboat built then floated to Ohura river junction. In 1927 this is transferred down river to Retaruke River junction where it was destroyed by fire in 1933.
 1906 – Native town council set up: Hakiaha Tawhiao, J.E. Ward (interpreter), J. Carrington. E.W. Simmons, A.J. Langmuir (chairman), J.E. Slattery. 
 1906, 14 Sep – First issue of the Taumarunui Press.
 1907 – First hospital erected, 5 beds. 
 1908–09 – North Island Main Trunk opened to through Auckland-Wellington trains from 9 November 1908, with the first NIMT express trains from 14 February 1909. 
 1908–11 William Thomas Jennings elected Member of Parliament for Taumarunui electorate 
 1910 – Borough of Taumarunui proclaimed. 
 1910 – Kaitieke Co-op Dairy Co. formed.
 1910 – George Henry Thompson defeated Rev John E. Ward (166 to 143 votes) to become the first borough council mayor.
 1912 – Population: Males: 641; Females: 487 – Note: 1912 census did not include a count of Maori.
 1912 – Township started getting water supply from Waitea Creek, just south of Piriaka.  Project cost £13,000.  Pipeline 8 miles long.
 1913 – William Henry Wackrow – Mayor
 1913, 22 Jul – First reported cases of Smallpox in district.
 1911–14 Charles Wilson elected Member of Parliament
 1914 – Taumarunui gas supply begins 

1914–18 – World War I
 1914–19 – William Thomas Jennings re-elected Member of Parliament
 1915 – Taumarunui Hospital Board formed, 30 beds.
 1915 – Only a single car in town.
 1915–1917 – Mayor: G.S. Steadman.
 1916 – Census: 3,021 (Taumarunui & Manunui)
 1917 – Tuku Te Ihu Te Ngarupiki, Chief of Rangatahi, dies in Matapuna near Taumarunui aged 97. 
 1917–1919 – Mayor: A.S. Laird.
 1919–1923 – Mayor: G.S. Steadman.
 1923–1925 – Mayor: C.C. Marsack.
 1924 – The Piriaka Power Station was built to supply electricity to Taumarunui.
 1925–1929 – Mayor: G.E. Manson.
 1928 – Four thousand bales of wool shipped down river
 1929–1944 – Mayor: Cecil Boles.
 1932 – Stratford–Okahukura Line completed.
 1939 – Hatricks's steamer ceased running, final section of the journey having been done by coach from Kirikau landing since 1927.

1939–1945 – World War II
 1941 – Cosmopolitan Club established with Father Conboy as first president.
 1944–1947 – W.S.N. Campbell.
 1947–1953 – Mayor: D.H. Hall.
 1951 – Census: 3,220
 1952 – Kaitieke County and Ohura County amalgamated with Taumarunui County.
 1953–1956 – Mayor: David C. Seath – later Member of Parliament for the King Country
 1956 – Mayor: Frank D. House – later Taumarunui High School governor.
 1956 – Census: 3,341
 1961 – Census: 4,961
 1962 – The King Country Electric Power Board commissioned its Kuratau Power Station.
 1966 – 1 October, 6:00pm – King Country Radio 1520AM with the call sign 1ZU first broadcasts from Taumarunui.
 1968 – N.Z. Sportsmen's dinner – attended by Fred Allen, Peter Snell, Waka Nathan, Colin Meads, Bob Skelton, Taini Jamieson, Tilley Vercoe, Ivan Grattan, Bill Wordley, Don Croot, Trevor Ormsby, Hine Peni and Sonny Bolstad.
 1971 – Additional generator to the Piriaka Power Scheme
 1976, 4 Oct – Daniel Houpapa shot by Armed Offenders Squad after he fires at an officer
 1981 – Census: 6,540, Full-time in labour force: 2,727
 1986 – Census: 6,468, Full-time in labour force: 2,514
 1988 – Taumarunui District Council formed.
Town Mayors immediately prior to 1988 include: Charles Binzegger, Les Byars and Terry Podmore.
 1989, 1 Nov – Taumarunui District Council merged into Ruapehu District Council.
 1991 – Census: 6,141, Full-time in labour force: 1,935
 1996 – Census: 5,835, Full-time in labour force: 1,438
 1997/98 – AFFCO Holdings freezing works closes.

2000s
 2001 – Census: 5,139
 2005/06 – Taumarunui Milk Co-op closes – 95 years after the original Kaitieke Co-op Dairy Co. was opened.
 2006 – Census: 5,052
 2009, Nov – Stratford–Okahukura Line mothballed.
 2010, 31 Mar – King Country Radio 1512AM & 92.7FM with the call sign 1ZU goes off air.
 2012, 25 Jun – Taumarunui Station passenger stop dropped from Northern Explorer's schedule.
 2013 – Census: 4,500

Marae

There are a number of marae in the Taumarunui area, affiliated with local iwi and hapū, including:

 Kimihia Marae is affiliated with Ngāti Te Wera
 Morero Marae and Hauaroa is affiliated with Ngāti Hekeawai and the Ngāti Hāua hapū of Ngāti Hāuaroa and Ngāti Reremai
 Ngāpuwaiwaha Marae and Te Taurawhiri a Hinengākau is affiliated with the Ngāti Hāua hapū of Ngāti Hāua and Ngāti Hāuaroa
 Petania Marae and Hinemihi meeting house are affiliated with the Ngāti Maniapoto hapū of Hinemihi, Parewaeono and Rōrā, and the Ngāti Tūwharetoa hapū of Ngāti Hinemihi
 Takaputiraha Marae is affiliated with Ngāti Maniapoto
 Te Peka Marae is affiliated with the Ngāti Hāua hapū of Ngāti Hekeāwai
 Tū Whenua Marae and Tū Whenua meeting house is affiliated with the Ngāti Maniapoto hapū of Mangu, Rewa and Tupu
 Whānau Maria Marae and Whānau Maria meeting house is affiliated with the Ngāti Hāua hapū of Ngāti Hāua
 Wharauroa Marae and Hikurangi meeting house is affiliated with the Ngāti Maniapoto hapū of Hinemihi, Rangatahi; with the Ngāti Hāua hapū of Ngāti Hekeawai, Ngāti Hinewai, Ngāti Hāuaroa, Ngāti Hāua, and Ngāti Wera/Tuwera; with Ngāti Hinewai; and with Ngāti Rangatahi.

In October 2020, the Government committed $1,560,379 from the Provincial Growth Fund to upgrade Takaputiraha Marae, Whānau Maria Marae, Wharauroa Marae and 5 other nearby marae, creating 156 jobs.

Locality

Township and borough 
On State Highway 4 south of Taumarunui are the villages of Manunui, Piriaka, Kakahi, Ōwhango, Raurimu and then National Park.  To the north are the school and truck stop of Māpiu.

Taumarunui County
Taumarunui County was defined in the Waikato and King-country Counties Act 1922, this statute states:

Then subsequently in 1952 the Kaitieke County and the Ohura County were amalgamated with a new Taumarunui County.

Then in 1988 the Taumarunui District Council was formed only to be replaced in 1989 as it was merged into the now Ruapehu District Council.

Demographics

There were 1,812 households. There were 2,307 males and 2,403 females, giving a sex ratio of 0.96 males per female, with 1,035 people (22.0%) aged under 15 years, 804 (17.1%) aged 15 to 29, 1,914 (40.7%) aged 30 to 64, and 966 (20.5%) aged 65 or older.

Ethnicities were 60.5% European/Pākehā, 52.1% Māori, 3.3% Pacific peoples, 3.5% Asian, and 1.4% other ethnicities (totals add to more than 100% since people could identify with multiple ethnicities).

The proportion of people born overseas was 9.9%, compared with 27.1% nationally.

Although some people objected to giving their religion, 47.9% had no religion, 36.1% were Christian, 0.8% were Hindu, 0.2% were Muslim, 0.6% were Buddhist and 6.4% had other religions.

Of those at least 15 years old, 315 (8.6%) people had a bachelor or higher degree, and 1,119 (30.5%) people had no formal qualifications. The employment status of those at least 15 was that 1,362 (37.1%) people were employed full-time, 489 (13.3%) were part-time, and 270 (7.4%) were unemployed.

Community institutions
Ngāpuwaiwaha marae is on Taumarunui Street; its main hapū are Ngāti Hāua and Ngāti Hauaroa of the iwi Te Āti Haunui-a-Pāpārangi.

Taumarunui has many societies and community organizations. It has a
Cosmopolitan Club and RSA, a Lodge of the Freemasons as well as
Taumarunui Lodge NZ No. 12 of the Royal Antediluvian Order of Buffaloes
Grand Council. This Lodge of the Buffaloes was established sometime in the
mid-late 1920s and thus predates the introduction of the Mighty NZR KA class steam locomotives
that became the hallmark of NIMT Rail Transport of the forties,
fifties and sixties.

Climate 
Under the Köppen, Taumarunui has an Oceanic climate:(Cfb). Due to location, low altitude and Geography surroundings, Taumarunui is more liable to warm to hot summers than other central North Island centres and in winter Taumarunui is cold and frosty. Annual sunshine yearly is 1822 hrs. In June 2002 Taumarunui recorded just 27 hrs of sun this lowest of the whole country beating the old record at Invercargill with 35 hrs in June 1935. The lowest temperature recorded in Taumarunui, −6.8 °C, was in July 2010.

Education

Notable people
 T.J. Meredith –  great-grandson of Theodore of Corsica, joined Royal Navy age 14, CSS Louisiana in 1862 American Civil War, under General Cameron New Zealand Wars, Waikato Mounted Rifles World War I, before coming the proprietor of Taumarunui's Meredith House with wife Margaret Lovett.

Students of Taumarunui High School
 Prof. James L. Beck – Professor of Engineering and Applied Science, California Institute of Technology.
 Prof. John C. Butcher  – Honorary Research Professor, Dept. of Mathematics, University of Auckland.
 Ben Fouhy, world champion kayaker.
 Marc and Todd Hunter from the band Dragon.
 Ivan Mercep, 2008 recipient of the New Zealand Institute of Architects Gold Medal.
 Jenny Ludlam –  actress.

Born in Taumarunui

 1914 – Wiremu Hakopa Toa Te Awhitu SM (1914–1994) was the first Māori to be ordained a Catholic priest.
 1922 – Lucy Ruth Miller (Ruth Kirk), DBE, wife of Prime Minister Norman Kirk and patron of SPUC
 1934 – Ian Barker, solicitor, judge, and legal scholar
 1935 – Don Selwyn, actor, director, stage and screen, Ngāti Kuri and Te Aupōuri (1935–2007)
 1936 – Carmen Rupe (né Trevor Rupe, 1935–15 December 2011) – Wellington personality (mayoral candidate (1977), drag queen, cafe owner and brothel keeper).
 1939 – David Penny, theoretical biologist.
 1945 – Carole Shepheard, artist.
 1951 – Joe Karam, rugby union player, researcher and investigator for David Bain's legal team.
 1952 – Rhonda Bryers, singer
 1952 – Ian Ferguson, Olympic canoer.
 1952 – Max Takuira Matthew Mariu SM (1952–2005), Auxiliary Catholic Bishop of Hamilton (1988–2005), first Māori to be ordained a Catholic bishop.
 1952 – Gary Troup, ONZM,  cricketer and Auckland region local government politician
 1953 – Marc Hunter, lead singer of Dragon.
 1955 – Mahinārangi Tocker, singer. 
 1956 – Len Brown Mayor of Auckland
 1958 – Jillian Smith, field hockey player.
 1958 – Lindsay Crocker, cricketer.
 1963 – Timothy J. Sinclair, political scientist at the University of Warwick in England.

 1966 – John Psathas, composer
 1971 – Kyle Chapman, former leader of the New Zealand National Front
 1973 – Chris McCormack World Champion Ironman Triathlete (2007, 2010).

 1979 – Ben Fouhy, Olympic and world champion canoeist
 1981 – Andrew Kirton, former General Secretary of the New Zealand Labour Party

Resident and New Years Honours recipients

 1956 – OBE – Pateriki Joseph Hura – For services to the Māori people, especially as a member of the Board of Maori Affairs.
 1957 – MBE – Mrs Catherine Goodsir – For social welfare services
 1958 – MBE – Mrs Rumatiki Wright of Raetihi. For services to the Māori people, especially as Senior Lady Māori Welfare Officer
 1961 – OBE – Pei Te Hurinui Jones – For services to the Māori people.
 1967 – MBE – James Dempsey J.P. –  chairman of the Taumarunui County Council.
 1970 – BEM – Eric Raymond Clark – For services to the community and interest in the education of the Māori people.
 1974 – BEM – Arthur Tukiri Anderson – For services to the Returned Services Association and the community
 1979 – KBE – Hepi Hoani Te Heuheu – For services to the Māori people and community.
 1995 – CBE – Alexander Phillips QSM – For services to the Māori people.
 1998 – MNZM – John Stacey Black J.P. – For services to the community.
 2000 – QSM – Jean Bassett – For Community Service
 2001 – QSM – Mrs Verna Lenice Warner J.P. – For Community Service
 2002 – MNZM – Mrs Nansi Whetu Dewes – For services to Māori and the community
 2002 – QSM – Barry David FISHER, of Taumarunui. Chief Fire Officer, Taumarunui Volunteer Fire Brigade, New Zealand Fire Service – For Services to the community
 2003 – QSM – Leonard Patrick Harwood – For Public Services
 2007 – QSM – Mr William Vernon McMinn – For services to music.
 2009 – MNZM – Ngarau Tarawa –  For services to Māori and community education
 2010 – QSM – Mrs Lorraine Ivy Edwards J.P. – For services to the community.
 2012 – MNZM – Ian Trevor Corney – For services to agriculture
 2013 – ONZM – Susan May Morris – For services to local government.

Notes

References

External links

 Taumarunui website
 Local History
 Taumarunui High School
 River Boat Landings
 Peter Cape's song, "Taumarunui on the Main Trunk Line"

Populated places in Manawatū-Whanganui
Settlements on the Whanganui River
Ruapehu District